Lugano District shootings is a spree shooting that occurred on March 4, 1992, in Origlio, Soresina, Massagno, Lugano District, Canton of Ticino, Switzerland. Erminio Criscione shot dead 6 people and wounded 6 others.

Shootings
On the evening of March 4th Erminio Criscione armed himself with a Kalashnikov rifle and drove to the house of his friend and co-worker in Origlio. The friend came to the door after Criscione rang the bell, and when the door opened Criscione fired twice, hitting his friend in each leg, Criscione turned around and walked away around 7:25 p.m. 

At 7:45 p.m. in Soresina Criscione attacked the family of another co-worker who were preparing for dinner. He shot and killed 4 members of the family and wounded 3 others.

At 8:00 p.m., he went on to kill 2 more colleagues before moving on to his final target, his boss.

At 8:20 p.m., Criscione arrived at the home of his boss in Massagno. His boss wasn't home and instead Criscione was greeted by the man's wife whom Criscione promptly shot twice in the legs before being told, "Tell him I'll be back".

Criscione would not be returning to the house however, as he was looking for Adriano Cavadini in the Camorino and was arrested at 9:15 p.m. whilst in his car. After the arrest, he was silent and cried.

Perpetrator
Erminio Criscione, 37 was an Italian emigrant from Mineo. Criscione was on a wholesale meat suppliers training course when the shooting occurred, in which he targeted former colleagues. His acquaintances described him as a quiet man who loved dogs and horses. He hung himself in a cell on a sheet between 5:45 pm and 8:00 pm March 9, 1992.

References

External links

Rievocazione della «Strage di Rivera» Re-enactment of the "Rivera Massacre"
Il ricordo della «Strage di Rivera» The memory of the "Rivera Massacre"

1992 mass shootings in Europe
Family murders
Spree shootings in Switzerland
Mass shootings in Switzerland